Hind Azouz (sometimes Azzuz) (August 18, 1926 - February 8, 2015) was a Tunisian writer.

Born in Tunis, Azouz was an autodidact. She published short stories and essays in a variety of organs during her career, including al-Hayah al-thaqafiya, al-Fikr, Qisas, al-Idha'a, al-Mar'a, al-Tarbiya al-shamila, al-'Amal, and al-Sabah; she also published a volume of short stories, Fi-l-darb-al-tawil (On the Long Road), in 1969. She received numerous medals from the government of Tunisia during her career, including the Medal of Culture, the Medal of Employment, and the Medal of National Struggle; she was also awarded certificates by numerous other groups. She belonged to the Tunisian Writers' Union and the Story Club in Tunis, and was secretary to the women's arm of the Democratic Constitutional Rally. Employed by Tunisia's national radio broadcaster as an announcer, she also headed its projects department. Her stories touch upon themes of interest to middle-class women, and cover such controversial topics as birth control and abortion. She was recognized as a pioneer in the field of broadcasting during her career.

References

1926 births
2015 deaths
Tunisian short story writers
Tunisian essayists
Tunisian women short story writers
Tunisian women essayists
20th-century short story writers
20th-century essayists
21st-century short story writers
21st-century essayists
20th-century Tunisian writers
21st-century Tunisian writers
People from Tunis
20th-century Tunisian women writers
21st-century Tunisian women writers